Rotoroa is a small settlement at the north western end of Lake Rotoroa in the South Island of New Zealand. Rotoroa is located in the Tasman Region.

References 

Populated places in the Tasman District